The United States National Snooker Championship is an annual snooker competition played in the United States and is the highest ranking amateur event in the US.

The competition was established in 1991 and was won by the late Tom Kollins, who went on to win the title again in 1992, 1998, 1999 and 2001. The 2020 Championship was canceled due to the COVID-19 pandemic, though it was back in 2021 at the New York Athletic Club and was won for a record sixth time by Ahmed Aly Elsayed.

Both the winner and runner-up are automatically selected to represent the United States in the following IBSF World Snooker Championship, and other annual international snooker events.

From 2014, due to a ruling by the IBSF, the Championship is now only open to U.S. citizens having previously also been open to U.S. permanent residents.

Winners

Stats

Finalists

References

Snooker amateur competitions
Recurring sporting events established in 1991
Snooker in the United States
Snookers
1991 establishments in the United States